Fantome Rock is a dangerous rock in the middle of Bird Sound, South Georgia, lying  south of Gony Point, Bird Island. It was charted by Discovery Investigations personnel on the Discovery in the period 1926–30 and named by the UK Antarctic Place-Names Committee in 1963 for 's motor cutter, used in a survey of this area in February–March 1961, and lost in heavy seas near this rock.

References 

Rock formations of South Georgia